The Monument to the Three Kichis is a memorial installed in the Vancouver, Washington portion of the Fort Vancouver National Historic Site, in the United States. The monument was dedicated on August 1, 1989.

See also
 1989 in art

References

External links
 

1989 establishments in Washington (state)
1989 sculptures
Monuments and memorials in Vancouver, Washington
Outdoor sculptures in Vancouver, Washington